FC Unisport-Auto Chişinău was a football club from Moldova. It existed between 1991 and 2005, when it was dissolved.

History
1991: Amocom Chişinău
1994: Sportul Studentesc Chişinău
1996: Merge with Universul Truşeni and Bucuria Chişinău to form Unisport Chişinău
1999: Merge with FC Nistru Otaci to form Nistru-Unisport Otaci
2000: Merge was cancelled, restarted as Unisport-Auto Chişinău in the Moldovan Divizia A

League record history

Unisport-2 Chişinău
Unisport-2 is the reserve team of Unisport, the Moldovan league system allow the reserve play in the same league system but not allowed to promoted to Divizia Naţională.

The team merged with Termotransauto Străşeni in 1997, to form Unisport-2 Termotransauto Străşeni.

In 2000 the second team became first team.

League record history 
{|class="wikitable"
|-bgcolor="#efefef"
! Season
!
! Pos.
! Pl.
! W
! D
! L
! GS
! GA
! P
!Notes
|-
|1997–98
|bgcolor=#ffa07a|2D
|align=right |12
|align=right|26||align=right|2||align=right|11||align=right|13
|align=right|22||align=right|48||align=right|17
|-
|1998–99
|bgcolor=#98bb98|3D
|align=right |
|align=right| ||align=right| ||align=right| ||align=right| 
|align=right| ||align=right| ||align=right|
|-
|1999–00
|bgcolor=#ffa07a|2D
|align=right |10
|align=right|26||align=right|7||align=right|7||align=right|12
|align=right|28||align=right|40||align=right|28
|-
|}

References

External links
Unisport-Auto Chișinău at soccerway.com
Unisport-Auto Chișinău at sport1.md
 Unisport-Auto Chișinău at footballdatabase.eu
 Unisport-Auto Chișinău at worldfootball.net
Unisport-Auto Chişinău at national-football-teams.com
Sportul Studentesc Chişinău at national-football-teams.com
Amocom Chişinău at national-football-teams.com

Defunct football clubs in Moldova
Football clubs in Chișinău
Association football clubs established in 1991
Association football clubs disestablished in 2005
1991 establishments in Moldova
2005 disestablishments in Moldova